= Journal of an Urban Robinson Crusoe =

2002 book by Des Marshall

- Author: Des Marshall
- Publisher: Saxon Books
- Publication date: 2002

Journal of an Urban Robinson Crusoe: London and Brighton is a book written by Des Marshall. It is a portrait of a troubled yet resilient and compassionate man and the people he meets in London and Brighton in the closing years of the twentieth century.

Taking the form of a journal, it is mostly based on Des Marshall's own experiences and covers a six-year period between 1995 and 2001. It was first published by Saxon Books in 2002.

In 2009 it was adapted into a play called The Urban Robinson Crusoe.
